Thomas McEwing Duncan (March 5, 1893 – February 22, 1959) was an American clerical worker from Milwaukee who served three terms as a  Socialist member of the Wisconsin State Assembly (1923–1928) and one term (1929–1932) as a member of the Wisconsin State Senate representing the Milwaukee-based 6th Senate district.

Background 
Duncan was born in Wisconsin on March 5, 1893 and was educated in the Milwaukee Public Schools. He graduated from Yale University in 1915. After graduation he was employed in the bond department of the First Wisconsin Trust Company, and later in the consolidated bond department of the First Wisconsin National Bank. He served as Secretary to Milwaukee Mayor Daniel Hoan from April 1920 to January 1, 1925, and as a member of the Milwaukee Firemen's and Policemen's Pension Commission.

Legislative service 
He was first elected to the Assembly in November 1922 without opposition to succeed fellow Socialist Fred Hasley. to represent the Fourth Milwaukee County Assembly district (the 21st ward of the City of Milwaukee).

Duncan was responsible for the 1930 introduction and passage of the partial veto into the Wisconsin state constitution, considered "the most extensive" veto power that has been "given to any state executive." He was considered less doctrinaire than Congressman Victor Berger, and at one time was discussed as a potential progressive candidate for Governor of Wisconsin under some form of Progressive/Socialist fusion ticket. He acted as executive secretary to Governor Philip La Follette, and was asserted to have (unsuccessfully) led efforts to lure Socialists into the La Follette camp. He did not seek re-election to the Senate in 1932; Socialist Assemblyman George Hampel was nominated to succeed Duncan in the 6th District, but was defeated by a Democrat in the 1932 Democratic landslide.

References

Clerks
Politicians from Milwaukee
Members of the Wisconsin State Assembly
Wisconsin state senators
Socialist Party of America politicians from Wisconsin
Yale University alumni
1893 births
1959 deaths
20th-century American politicians